Dubček  is a 2018 Slovak historical film based on life of Alexander Dubček, a Slovak politician who served as the First Secretary of the Presidium of the Central Committee of the Communist Party of Czechoslovakia (KSČ) and who attempted to reform the communist government during the Prague Spring but was forced to resign following the Warsaw Pact invasion in August 1968.

Cast

See also
 Havel (film)
 Walesa: Man of Hope

References

External links
 
 Dubček at CSFD.cz 

2018 films
Slovak historical films
Slovak-language films
2010s historical films